The Staithes group or Staithes School was an art colony of 19th-century painters based in the North Yorkshire fishing village of Staithes.

Inspired by French Impressionists such as Monet, Cézanne and Renoir, the group of about 25 artists worked together in plein air, in oil or watercolour.

The group contained renowned artists such as Laura Knight (who kept a studio in the village with her husband and fellow painter Harold Knight), Frederick W. Jackson, Edward E. Anderson, Joseph R. Bagshawe, Thomas Barrett and James W. Booth.

Member artists
Edward Enoch Anderson (1878–1961)
John Atkinson (1863–1924)
Joseph R. Bagshawe (1870–1909)
Thomas Barrett (1848–1924)
James William Booth (1867–1953)
Owen Bowen (1873–1967)
John Bowman (1872–1915)
Andrew Charles Colley (1859–1910)
Harold Edward Conway (b.1872)
Lionel Townsend Crawshaw (1864–1949)
Ernest Dade (1868–1936)
William Gilbert Foster (1855–1906)
Arthur A Friedenson (1872–1955)
Sidney Valentine Gardner (1869–1957)
Ralph Hedley (1848–1913)
Florence Adelina Hess (1891–1974)
Leandro Ramón Garrido (1869–1909)
Rowland Henry Hill (1873–1952)
Henry Silkstone Hopwood (1860–1914)
John William Howey (1873–1938)
John Spence Ingall (1850–1936)
Frederick William Jackson (1859–1918)
Isabella (Isa) Jobling (née Thompson) (1851–1926)
Robert Jobling (1841–1923)
Harold Knight (1874–1961)
Dame Laura Knight (née Johnson) (1877–1970)
Charles Hodge Mackie (1862–1920)
Frank Henry Mason (1875–1965)
Hannah Mayor (née Hoyland) (1871–1947)
William Frederick Mayor (1865–1916)
Paul Paul (1865–1937)
Frederick Stuart Richardson (1855–1934)
Ernest Higgins Rigg (1868–1947)
Mark Senior (1862–1927)
Albert George Stevens (1863–1925)
Percy Morton Teasdale (1870–1961)
Joseph Alfred Terry (1872–1939)
Hirst Walker (1868–1957)
James Watson (1851–1936)
John Wright (1857–1933)

Exhibitions
Pannett Park Museum and Art Gallery, Whitby, North Yorkshire YO21 1RE

See also
Art colony
Cullercoats
Newlyn School

External links
 The Staithes Group - David Duggleby
 The Staithes Group (1894-1909) A Brief History...
 The Staithes Group Exhibition & Lecture 2015
 T.B. & R. Jordan
 Frederick Jackson
 "Artists' colonies in Staithes and Runswick Bay c.1880-1914" PhD thesis by Robert Slater, 2010

References

English artist groups and collectives
19th-century English painters
Culture in North Yorkshire